The 1855 Alabama gubernatorial election was held on August 6,  in order to elect the governor of Alabama. incumbent governor John A. Winston won his second term as governor.

Candidates

Democratic Party
 John A. Winston

Know Nothing
At the time, the Know Nothing Party was known as the American Party.
 George D. Shortridge

Election

References

Alabama gubernatorial elections
1855 Alabama elections
Alabama
August 1855 events